The Detonators, published in 1985, is a novel in the long-running secret agent series Matt Helm by Donald Hamilton.

Plot summary
Matt Helm is assigned to assassinate an expert in explosives who is planning to build his own atomic weapon.

External links
Synopsis and summary

1985 American novels
Matt Helm novels